K-9 Bass is the third and final album released by rap group, The Dogs. It was released on November 17, 1992 through Joey Boy Records and featured production from The Dogs, Carleton Mills and Calvin Mills. By the time this album was released, Disco Rick and Cracked Up had left the group, leaving just Keith Bell and Labrant Dennis as the only two members of The Dogs. K-9 Bass was not a success, only peaking at #95 on the Top R&B/Hip-Hop Albums chart.

Track listings

Explicit

"Outta Gas"- 3:20
"Shake Dance"- 3:14   
"Suck It Before I Fuck It"- 2:59   
"Gimme, Gimme, Gimme"- 3:16 
"Mutt Them Hoes"- 3:36   
"It's Time To Groove"- 4:00   
"DoggaMixxx II"- 3:19 
"Dookie Shoot"- 3:32  
"Pass the Pussy"- 3:58 
"Broamin"- 3:41   
"The Bite Has Begun"- 2:34

Clean

 "Outta Gas"- 3:20
 "Shake Dance"- 3:14
  "Lick it Before I Stick it"- 2:59
 "Gimme, Gimme, Gimme"- 3:16
 "Mutt Them Girls"- 3:36
  "It's Time To Groove"- 4:00
  "DoggaMixxx II"- 3:19
  "Dookie Shoot" - 3:32
  "Pass the Coochie"- 3:58
  "Broamin"- 3:41 
  "The Bite Has Begun"- 2:34

1992 albums
The Dogs albums